Akhunovo (Axun) is a rural locality (a village) in Mikyashevsky Selsoviet, Davlekanovsky District, Bashkortostan, Russia. The population was 72 as of 2010. There is 1 street.

Geography 
Akhunovo is located 25 km west of Davlekanovo (the district's administrative centre) by road. Gorchaki is the nearest rural locality.

References 

Rural localities in Davlekanovsky District